This is a list of Colonial Governors of Honduras. The first governor who ruled this colony was Álvaro de Saavedra Cerón between 1525 and 1526, although Honduras was not conquered and pacified until 1536 by Pedro de Alvarado.

During Honduras's colonial period, the territory went through three periods: In the first (1525 – 26 Jun 1787), the people who ruled Honduras were recognized as Governors. In the second period (26 June 1787 – 1812), Honduras was ruled by so-called Governor-Intendants, while in the third period (4 February 1812 – 28 September 1821), Honduras was ruled from Guatemala. So, the people who ruled Honduras in this period were Mayors.

Governors 
 Álvaro de Saavedra Cerón (d. 1529): 1525 – 27 October 1526
  Diego López de Salcedo: 27 October 1526 – 1530
 Andrés de Cerezeda (d. c.1540): 1530 – 1532 (1st time)
 Diego Alvítez: 1532
 Andrés de Cerezeda: 1532 – 1535 (2nd time)
 Francisco de Montejo: 1535 – 1540 (1st time)
 Diego Garcia de Celis: 1541 – 1542
 Francisco de Montejo: 1542 – 1544 (2nd time)
 Juan Pérez de Cabrera: 1552 – 1555
 Pedro de Salvatierra: 1555 – 1562
 Alonso Ortiz de Elgueta: 1563 – 1564
 Alonso Ortiz de Argueta: 1564 - 1567.
 Juan de Vargas Carvajal: 1567 – 1570
 Juan de Soto Pachón: 1570 - 1573 
 Diego de Herrera: 1573 – 1577
 Alonso de Contreras Guevara: 1577 – 1582
 Rodrigo Ponce de León: 1582 – 1589
 Jerónimo Sánchez de Carranza: 1589 – 1594
 Rodrigo Ponce de León: (2º term) 1594 – 1602
 Jorge de Alvarado y Villafañe: 1602 – 1605
 Pedro de Castro: 1605 – 1608
 Juan Guerra de Ayala: 1608 – 1612
 García Garabito de León: 1612 – 1617
 Juan Lobato: 1617 – 1620
 Juan de Miranda: 1620 – 1625
 Pedro del Rosal: 1625 – 1632
 Francisco Martínez de la Ribamontan Santander: 1632 – 1639
 Francisco de Ávila y Lugo: 1639 – 1641
 Alonso de Silva Salazar: 1641 – 1643
 Juan de Bustamante Herrera: 1643 – 1644
 Melchor Alonso Tamayo: 1644 – 1647
 Baltasar de la Cruz: 1647 – 1650
 Juan de Zuazo: 1650 – 1668
 Juan Márquez Cabrera: 1668 – 1672
 Pedro de Godoy Ponce de León: 1673 – 1676
 Francisco de Castro y Ayala: 1676 – 1679
 Lorenzo Ramírez de Guzmán: 1679 – 1682
 Antonio de Navia y Bolaños: 1682 – 1687
 Sancho Ordóñez: 1689 – 1693
 Antonio de Oseguera y Quevedo: 1693 – 1698
 Antonio de Ayala: 1698 – 1702
 Antonio de Monfort: 1702 – 1705
 Gregorio de Salinas Varona: 1705 – 1709
 Enrique Longman: 1712 – 1715
 José Rodezno: 1715 – 1717
 Diego Gutiérrez de Argüelles: 1717 – 1727
 Manuel de Castilla y Portugal: 1727 – 1738
 Francisco de Parga: 1738 – 1741
 Tomás Hermenegildo de Arana: 1741 – 1745
 Luis Machado: 1745 – 1746
 Juan de Vera: 1746 – 1747
 Alonso Fernández de Heredia: 1747
 Diego de Tablada (interim): 14 junio 1747 – 1750
 Pedro Trucco (interim): 1750 – 1751
 Pantaleón Ibáñez Cuevas: 2 July 1751 – 1757
 Fulgencio García de Solís: 1757 – 1759
 Gabriel Franco (interim): 1759 – 1761
 José Sáenz Bahamonde: 1761 – 1769 (death)
 Juan Antonio González: (interim) 1769 – 13 May 1770
 Antonio Ferrandis (interim): 13 May 1770 – 1770
 Bartolomé Pérez Quijano: 1770 – 1775
 Agustín Pérez Quijano: 1775 – 1779
 Francisco Aybar: 1779 – 1783
 Juan Nepomuceno de Quesada y Barnuevo: 11 August 1783 – 26 June 1787

Governor-Intendants 
 Juan Nepomuceno de Quesada y Barnuevo:  26 Jun 1787 – 1789
 Alejo García Conde: 7 May 1789 – 1796
Ramón de Anguiano: June 1796 – 1808
 Antonio Noberto Serrano y Polo (b. 1753 – d. 1820): 1804 – 1810 (acting for absent Anguiano)
 Carlos Castañón: 1810 – 1812

Mayors 
Since 1812, the Governors of Honduras became in Mayors, because Honduras was governed from Guatemala.

 José María Píñol y Muñoz: January 1812 –  4 Feb 1812  (acting for Castañón)
 Juan Francisco Marqués: 4 Feb 1812 –  1 Mar 1812
 Pedro Gutiérrez: 1 Mar 1812 – Apr 1812
 Juan Antonio de Tornos: Apr 1812 – 1818
 José Gregorio Tinoco de Contreras (b. c.1780 – d. 18..): 1818 – 21 Nov 1821
 Juan Nepomuceno Fernandez Lindo  y Zelaya (acting) (b. 1790 – d. 1857):  21 November 1821 – 28 September 1822

See also 
 List of presidents of Honduras

References 

Governors of Honduras
Honduras